Harold Crocker is an American college athletics administrator and former football coach. He is the athletic director at Ramapo College in Mahwah, New Jersey, a position he has held since 2015. Crocker served as the head football coach at  Iona College in New Rochelle, New York from 1985 to 1997, compiling a record of 49–79–1. He was a Northeast-New England scout for the New York Football Giants in 1997-98.  Crocker was the athletic director at the College of New Rochelle from 1998 to 2015.

Head coaching record

College

References

External links
 Ramapo profile

Year of birth missing (living people)
Living people
American football defensive tackles
American football linebackers
Central Connecticut Blue Devils football players
Iona Gaels football coaches
New Rochelle Blue Angels athletic directors
Ramapo Roadrunners athletic directors
High school football coaches in New York (state)